Jerry van de Bunt is a Grand Prix motorcycle racer from the Netherlands. He races in the European Supermono Cup aboard a Raha.

Career statistics

By season

Races by year

References

External links
 Profile on motogp.com

Living people
1992 births
Dutch motorcycle racers
125cc World Championship riders
21st-century Dutch people